Nossa Senhora da Conceição church (Portuguese for Our Lady of Conception) is a church at the southeastern edge of the village Povoação Velha, on the island of Boa Vista, Cape Verde. It sits at the foot of the mountain Rocha Estância.

It was built in 1828. Its interior is decorated with a colourfully painted chancel that has numerous little images of saints. Each year on December 8, the Feast of the Immaculate Conception is celebrated and forms one of the major religious celebrations on the island.

See also
List of buildings and structures in Cape Verde
List of churches in Cape Verde

References

Roman Catholic churches in Cape Verde
Boa Vista, Cape Verde
Portuguese colonial architecture in Cape Verde